Sleeping with the Enemy is a 1991 film based on the Nancy Price novel.

Sleeping with the Enemy may also refer to:

Books
 Sleeping with the Enemy (novel), a 1987 novel by Nancy Price

Film and TV
 "Sleeping with the Enemy", a 1993 season 4 episode of the television series, Northern Exposure
 "Sleeping with the Enemy", a 1995 season 3 episode of the television series, Frasier
 "Sleeping with the Enemy" (The Simpsons), a 2004 episode of The Simpsons

Music
 Sleeping with the Enemy (album), a 1992 album by Paris
 "Sleeping with the Enemy", a song by Mike Got Spiked
 "Sleeping with the Enemy", a song by Kylie Minogue from the album Kiss Me Once
 "Had a Dream (Sleeping with the Enemy)", a song by Roger Hodgson from his album In the Eye of the Storm